State Route 106 (SR 106) is part of Maine's system of state highways, located in northeastern Androscoggin County.  It is a secondary highway running from an intersection with U.S. Route 202 (US 202), SR 11, and SR 100 south of Leeds northwest to Livermore Falls, where it intersects SR 133.  SR 106 is signed as a north–south highway.

Route description
SR 106 begins at US 202/SR 11/SR 100 in Leeds, in the southern corner of town.  The highway runs northward into town, along the west side of Androscoggin Lake, until it meets SR 219.  The two routes share a brief concurrency before SR 106 turns back north along the Androscoggin River.  The highway crosses into the town limits of Livermore Falls and ends at an intersection with SR 133, south of town.

Junction list

References

External links

Floodgap Roadgap's RoadsAroundME: Maine State Route 106

106
Transportation in Androscoggin County, Maine